John Taylor (22 July 1902 – 1 March 1962) was a British Labour Party politician who served as member of parliament for West Lothian.

He was first elected at the 1951 general election, and his death in 1962 at the age of 59 caused a hotly contested by-election, in which William Wolfe of the Scottish National Party was beaten by Labour's Tam Dalyell.

Notes

External links 
 

1902 births
1962 deaths
Scottish Labour MPs
Members of the Parliament of the United Kingdom for Scottish constituencies
UK MPs 1951–1955
UK MPs 1955–1959
UK MPs 1959–1964